World Series of Fighting 18: Moraes vs. Hill was a mixed martial arts event held , in Edmonton, Alberta, Canada. This event aired on NBCSN in the U.S and on TSN2 in Canada.

Background
Moraes was scheduled to defend his title against Josh Hill on September 13, 2014 at World Series of Fighting 13 but was rescheduled for this event. The main event was a fight for the WSOF Bantamweight Championship between champion Marlon Moraes and challenger Josh Hill.

Results

See also 
 World Series of Fighting
 List of WSOF champions
 List of WSOF events

References

Events in Edmonton
World Series of Fighting events
2015 in mixed martial arts